Poly (ADP-ribose) polymerase family, member 16 is a protein in humans that is encoded by the PARP16 gene.

References

External links 
 PDBe-KB provides an overview of all the structure information available in the PDB for Human Protein mono-ADP-ribosyltransferase PARP16

Further reading 

Genes on human chromosome 15